Heart of a Lion is a 2013 Finnish drama film directed by Dome Karukoski. It was screened in the Contemporary World Cinema section at the 2013 Toronto International Film Festival. The film tells the story about a Neo-Nazi named Teppo, who falls in love with a woman named Sari. He later finds out that Sari's son from the previous marriage is black. This leads Teppo to trouble with his fellow Neo-Nazis, especially his half-brother Harri.

Cast
 Peter Franzén as Teppo
 Jasper Pääkkönen as Harri
 Laura Birn as Sari
 Pamela Tola
 Jussi Vatanen
 Timo Lavikainen

References

External links
 

2013 films
2013 drama films
Films about racism
Finnish drama films
2010s Finnish-language films
Films directed by Dome Karukoski
Skinhead films
2010s gang films